Rentschler Heliport  is a private heliport for the exclusive use of Raytheon Technologies, located 2 miles southeast of East Hartford, Connecticut.

From 1933 to about 1997, Rentschler Field was an airfield used by the United States Army Air Forces during World War II as a fighter base.

History 
This former airfield was located only a few miles northeast of still-operational Hartford Brainard Airport. It was the former factory airfield for the Pratt & Whitney aircraft engine company.

The airfield, which began operations in 1931, was named after Frederick Brant Rentschler, who founded the aircraft arm of Pratt & Whitney and later founded its current parent company, United Technologies.

During World War II, Rentschler Field was used by the Army Air Force to provide fighter coverage for the area. In 1999, it was decommissioned as an airport and donated to the state of Connecticut by United Technologies in 1999. A portion of the former airport was redeveloped as Rentschler Field, the University of Connecticut's new football stadium, which opened in 2003.

As of 2006, the only remaining aviation use on the site was the Rentschler Heliport, a private facility operated by Pratt & Whitney.

References

External links 

Heliports in the United States
Airports in Hartford County, Connecticut